Trępnowy  is a village in the administrative district of Gmina Nowy Staw. It lies within Malbork County, Pomeranian Voivodeship, in northern Poland. 

The village has a population of 283.

References

Villages in Malbork County